Mariani Maximin (13 June 1914 in Port-Louis, Guadeloupe - 7 July 2011) is a politician from Guadeloupe who served in the French National Assembly from 1978 to 1981.

References
 page on the French National Assembly website 
Notice of Death

1914 births
2011 deaths
People from Port-Louis, Guadeloupe
Guadeloupean politicians
Rally for the Republic politicians
Deputies of the 6th National Assembly of the French Fifth Republic